The national parks of New Zealand are protected natural areas administered by the Department of Conservation (DOC). The first national parks established in the country were all focused on mountain scenery. Since the 1980s the focus has been on developing a more diverse representation of New Zealand landscapes. The parks are all culturally significant and many also contain historic features. Tongariro National Park is one of the World Heritage Sites that are of both cultural and natural significance, while four of the South Island national parks form Te Wahipounamu, another World Heritage Site. There are currently 13 national parks; a 14th, Te Urewera National Park, was disestablished in 2014.

The national parks are administered by the Department of Conservation "for the benefit, use, and enjoyment of the public". They are popular tourist destinations, with three-tenths of overseas tourists visiting at least one national park during their stay in New Zealand.

National Parks Act 
The National Parks Act of 1980 was established in order to codify the purpose, governance and selection of national parks. It begins by establishing the definition of a national park:

The National Parks Act goes on to state that the public will have freedom of entry and access to the parks, though this is subject to restrictions to ensure the preservation of native plants and animals and the welfare of the parks in general. Access to specially protected areas (550 km2) constituted under the act is by permit only.
Under the Act, national parks are to be maintained in their natural state as far as possible to retain their value as soil, water and forest conservation areas. Native plants and animals are to be preserved and introduced plants and animals removed if their presence interferes with the natural wildlife. Development in wilderness areas established under the act is restricted to foot tracks and huts used for wild animal control or scientific research.

Services available for public use
The Act allows the Department of Conservation to provide hostels, huts, camping grounds, ski tows and similar facilities, parking areas, roading and tracks within the parks. In addition to these, the department also provides some accommodation, transport and other services at entry points to the parks, but these are also offered by other government agencies, voluntary organisations and private firms. More comprehensive services within the parks, such as guided walks and skiing tutorials, are privately provided with concessions from the department.

List of national parks
This table lists the current and former national parks from north to south.

Timeline 
<div style="float: centre">

Proposed national parks
The area centred on Waipoua Forest, north of Dargaville, has been proposed as a possible Kauri National Park. The area contains most of New Zealand's remaining kauri, including the largest known kauri, Tāne Mahuta. These stands of kauri are also valuable as havens for endangered species including the North Island brown kiwi. This proposal is currently being investigated by the Department of Conservation.

In response to a DoC proposal to upgrade the protection of Great Barrier Island (Aotea), Forest and Bird launched a campaign in 2014 to designate it as a National Park.

In 2020, the New Zealand National Party announced that they would create two new national parks if elected at the general election, namely Coromandel National Park and Catlins National Park.

Mining concerns
In 2010 the New Zealand Government proposed removing some national park and conservation areas from Schedule 4 protection of the Crown Minerals Act which prohibits mining in those areas. In July the government abandoned the proposal after receiving a large number of submissions, most of which opposed mining.

See also
Protected areas of New Zealand
List of national parks for other national parks around the world.
Regional parks of New Zealand
Forest parks of New Zealand

References

External links

 National Park information at the Department of Conservation
 Kauri National Park proposal at the Department of Conservation
  - 'National parks' in Te Ara, The Encyclopedia of New Zealand (last updated 2015-08-15; accessed 2017-08-23).

 
New Zealand
National parks